Sara Yüceil (born 22 June 1988) is a Belgian football midfielder who plays for PSV in the Dutch Eredivisie Women. She played for Standard Liège and OH Leuven in Belgium before moving to France.

Honours 
Standard Liège
Winner
 BeNe League: 2014–15

References

External links 
 
 Player stats  at footofeminin.fr

1988 births
Living people
Belgian women's footballers
Women's association football midfielders
Belgium women's international footballers
Expatriate women's footballers in France
Standard Liège (women) players
Olympique de Marseille (women) players
Division 1 Féminine players
Belgian people of Turkish descent
Oud-Heverlee Leuven (women) players
PSV (women) players
Expatriate women's footballers in the Netherlands
Belgian expatriate sportspeople in France
Belgian expatriate sportspeople in the Netherlands
Footballers from Hainaut (province)
Sportspeople from Mons
UEFA Women's Euro 2017 players